Rory Reid may refer to:

Rory Reid (politician) (born 1963), American attorney and politician
Rory Reid (journalist) (born 1979), English television presenter

See also
Rory Read, American businessman